The Sharp Stewart 0-8-2T locomotives were 0-8-2T steam tank locomotives designed and built by Sharp, Stewart and Company for the Port Talbot Railway and Docks Company, south Wales.   Three were built in 1901, works nos. 4794 - 4796.  They were numbered 17-19 and became Great Western Railway numbers 1358-1360.

These were unusually large locomotives for their time and place.  Most of the railways of South Wales relied on 0-6-2T tank locomotives.

Number 1360 was withdrawn in November 1926, followed by 1359 in December 1935.  Number 1358 survived to be taken over by British Railways on 1 January 1948 but was withdrawn on 29 February 1948.  None of these locomotives has been preserved.

See also
 Port Talbot Railway 0-8-2T (Cooke)
 Port Talbot Railway 0-6-2T (Stephenson)
 Locomotives of the Great Western Railway

Sources
 Rail UK database entry for 1358

Port Talbot Railway and Docks Company locomotives
0-8-2T locomotives
Sharp Stewart locomotives
Railway locomotives introduced in 1901
Scrapped locomotives
Standard gauge steam locomotives of Great Britain
Freight locomotives